Brayan Yohangel Hurtado Cortesía (born 21 June 1999) is a Venezuelan footballer who plays as a forward for Chilean Primera División side Deportes Antofagasta.

International career
He made his debut for the Venezuela national football team on 14 October 2021 in a World Cup qualifier against Chile.

Career statistics

Club

Notes

Honours
Mineros de Guayana
 Copa Venezuela (1): 2017

References

External links

1999 births
Living people
Venezuelan footballers
Venezuela under-20 international footballers
Venezuela international footballers
Venezuelan expatriate footballers
Association football forwards
Venezuelan Primera División players
USL Championship players
Chilean Primera División players
A.C.C.D. Mineros de Guayana players
Portland Timbers 2 players
Cobresal footballers
Expatriate soccer players in the United States
Venezuelan expatriate sportspeople in the United States
Expatriate footballers in Chile
Venezuelan expatriate sportspeople in Chile
People from Ciudad Guayana